Luiz Bevilacqua is a Brazilian scientist best known for his work as President of the Brazilian Space Agency (2003–2004) and as Secretary General of the Ministry of Science and Technology (1992–1993). Currently serves as Emeritus Professor, UFRJ and coordinator of the Center for Cognition and Complex Systems of UFABC.

Positions held
Bevilacqua has served as:
 Vice-Rector of the Pontifícia Universidade Católica do Rio de Janeiro (PUC-Rio).
 Director of the Instituto Alberto Luiz Coimbra de Pos-Graduacao e Pesquisa de Engenharia (COPPE-UFRJ).
 Creator of the Civil Engineering Program of Instituto Alberto Luiz Coimbra de Pos-Graduacao e Pesquisa de Engenharia (COPPE-UFRJ).
 Project Coordinator of Remotely Operated Vehicles (COPPETEC-Petrobras).
 Coordinator of the consultancy to determine the structural integrity of the Mills Ball Shark (COPPETEC-Companhia Vale do Rio Doce).
 Responsible for structural design of the spillways and gates of the Furnas Reservoir.
 Responsible for the design of nuclear components (pipes and pressure vessels) class nuclear of power plants Angra I and Angra II.
 President of the Brazilian Association of Mechanical Sciences (ABCM).
 President of the comite of engineering of the Coordenação de Aperfeiçoamento de Pessoal de Nível Superior (CAPES).
 Secretary-General of the Ministry of Science and Technology (MCT).
 Director of Research Units of the Conselho Nacional de Desenvolvimento Científico e Tecnológico (CNPq).
 Scientific Director of Fundação Carlos Chagas Filho de Amparo à Pesquisa do Estado do Rio de Janeiro (FAPERJ).
 Coordinator of the Graduate of the Laboratório Nacional de Computação Científica (LNCC).
 President of the Brazilian Space Agency (AEB).
 Professor Emeritus, Universidade Federal do Rio de Janeiro (UFRJ).
 Member of the team that created the education program of the Universidade Federal do ABC (UFABC).
 Presidente of the Implementation's Comite of the Universidade Federal do ABC (UFABC).
 Vice-Rector of the Universidade Federal do ABC (UFABC).
 Rector of the Universidade Federal do ABC (UFABC).
 Coordinator of the Center for Cognition and Complex Systems, Universidade Federal do ABC (UFABC).

University
 Civil Engineer - University of Brazil, UB - 1959.
 Specialist (Bridges and Structures) - Technische Hochschule Stuttgart - 1961.
 Professor (Electrical resistance) - Federal University of Rio de Janeiro, UFRJ - 1966.
 Ph.D. (Applied Mechanics) - Stanford University - 1971.

Awards
Decorations:
 Commander of the Order of Rio Branco - Ministry of External Relations - 1994
 Commander of the Brazilian Order of Scientific Merit - President of the Republic of Brazil - 1995
 Grand Cross of the Brazilian Order of Scientific Merit - President of the Republic of Brazil - 2000
 Award "Almirante Álvaro Alberto (Engineering Sciences) - National Council of Scientific and Technological Development - 1995
 Award "Prêmio Anísio Teixeira" - Coordenação de Aperfeiçoamento de Pessoal de Nível Superior - 2011

Cronologia

See also

UFABC - Federal University of ABC
Brazilian Order of Scientific Merit
Model of the Fluid Particle

References

Living people
Recipients of the Great Cross of the National Order of Scientific Merit (Brazil)
Commanders of the National Order of Scientific Merit (Brazil)
Pontifical Catholic University of Rio de Janeiro people
Year of birth missing (living people)